Moses Comstock (1714 – January 18, 1789) was a member of the Connecticut House of Representatives from Norwalk in 1777.

He was the son of Moses Comstock and  Abigail Brinsmade.

In 1777, Eli Reed, Asa Hoyt, John Gregory, Jr., Levi Taylor, Nathan Hubbell, and Moses Comstock were appointed a Committee to find the number of soldiers enlisted in the Continental Army, in Norwalk, and report to the Norwalk town meeting.

His father, also named Moses, was the owner of the last slave in Connecticut, Onesimus Brown.

He died in New Canaan on January 18, 1789.

References 

1714 births
1789 deaths
Members of the Connecticut House of Representatives
Politicians from Norwalk, Connecticut
18th-century American politicians